Jeux sans frontières was a Europe-wide television game show.
The results shown here are for the winter series which was filmed in December 1991 and January 1992 and broadcast during January and February 1992.

Participating countries and cities

Heats

Heat 1

Heat 2

Heat 3

Heat 4

Semi-finals 
 Qualifying teams

 Results

Final 

Jeux sans frontières
1991 television seasons
1992 television seasons
Television game shows with incorrect disambiguation